Frank Jackson State Park is a public recreation area that wraps around Lake Frank Jackson and forms the northwesternmost portion of the city of Opp, Alabama. The  state park offers facilities for fishing, boating, hiking, and camping.

History
The park opened as Lightwood Knot Creek State Park in 1970. It has borne the name of longtime Covington County legislator Frank Jackson since the 1980s.

Activities and amenities
Fishing tournaments are regularly held on Lake Frank Jackson, a  impoundment of Lightwood Knot Creek. Bass, bream and crappie are abundant. The park has  of easy walking trails that include a loop trail around an island in the lake that is accessed from a boardwalk/bridge.

References

External links
Frank Jackson State Park Alabama Department of Conservation and Natural Resources

State parks of Alabama
Protected areas of Covington County, Alabama
Protected areas established in 1970
1970 establishments in Alabama